is a train station on the  Osaka Metro Yotsubashi Line in Nishinari-ku, Osaka, Japan.

While situated relatively close to the  station served by the Sakaisuji Line and Nankai Railway, there are no transfer passageways between the two stations.

Layout
There are two side platforms with two tracks on the first basement.

External links

  
  

Osaka Metro stations
Railway stations in Japan opened in 1956